Saint Arsenius (Arsenios) of Corfu, also known as Arsenius of Kerkyra, (died 800 or perhaps 959) is one of the principal patron saints of Corfu along with Saint Spyridon.  He was born in Constantinople to the Jewish faith.  He became a Christian and the first bishop of Corfu.

References

External links 
 Saints of January 19: Arsenius of Corfu 
 Santiebeati: Arsenius of Corfu

Christian saints in unknown century
Greek Orthodox bishops of Corfu
Saints of medieval Greece
Year of death uncertain
Year of birth unknown
People from Constantinople
Converts to Christianity from Judaism